is a railway station in the city of Inuyama, Aichi Prefecture,  Japan, operated by Meitetsu.

Lines
It is also served by the Meitetsu Inuyama Line and is 29.4 kilometers from the starting point of the line at .Inuyama station is also a terms of the 22.3 kilometer Meitetsu Hiromi Line.

Station layout
The station has three elevated island platforms with an elevated station building. After a renovation completed in mid-December 2010, there are two wickets.  The renovated portions of the station entered service on December 20, 2010, at which time the station became handicapped-accessible.  Previously, there was one wicket, but after renovation this became the South Wicket, and the newly completed wicket became the North Wicket.  The renovation also included new LED displays indicating the next trains arriving at the station, which replaced displays which mechanically flipped cards. There are two exits, the East Exit and the West Exit. The station has automated ticket machines, Manaca automated turnstiles and is staffed.

Platforms

Adjacent stations

|-
!colspan=5|Nagoya Railroad

Station history
Inuyama Station opened on August 8, 1912.

Passenger statistics
In fiscal 2015, the station was used by an average of 17,050 passengers daily.

Surrounding area
 Inuyama Castle
Inuyama City Hall

See also
 List of Railway Stations in Japan

References

External links

 Official web page 

Railway stations in Japan opened in 1912
Railway stations in Aichi Prefecture
Stations of Nagoya Railroad
Inuyama, Aichi